Mohammad Mansha (born June 9, 1962) is a former Pakistan sprinter who represented the country at the 1984 Summer Olympics in Los Angeles, in  both the 100 and 200 metres events.

Strangely, Mansha had no significant achievements either at the national or international level before the Los Angeles Olympiad. There he finished seventh and last in the 100 metres event with a time of 10.87 seconds. The man who led Mansha's particular heat was Jamaica's Ray Stewart who did so in 10.24 seconds. Stewart ran in sixth in the final in 10.29 seconds.

Mansha's time in the 200 metres race was 22.04 seconds. He ended sixth out of eight runners in his heat. Italy's Carlo Simionato with a time of 21.06 was first. Simionato didn't make the event's final.

Mansha finally made a mark at the Pakistan domestic level at Islamabad in 1985, when he took the 200 metres gold in the National Athletics Championship. He repeated this feat at Quetta in 1986 when he also finished second in the 100 metres race. Mansha had an identical time of 21.7 seconds in his two 200 metres wins.

At the South Asian Federation (SAF) Games in Dhaka, Bangladesh, in 1985, Mansha took silver medals in both the 100 metres (10.8sec) and 200 metres (21.58sec) events. Mohammed Shah Alam of Bangladesh won the gold medal in 100 metres (also with a time of 10.8) while India's Neelapu Rami Reddy was first in the 200 metres with a time of 21.1 seconds.

Mansha's third medal at the 1985 SAF Games was a bronze in the 4x100 metres relay, the Pakistan quartet finishing in a time of 42.1 seconds.

Mansha had taken part in the first SAG Games in Kathmandu in 1984 without winning any medals. He also toured China with a Pakistan squad and Alexandria (for the 31st CISM Military Games) later the same year, without achieving anything of note.

At the Asian Games in Seoul in 1986, Mansha ran his 200 metres first round heat 2 in 22.21 seconds and was eliminated. He finished fourth in the 200 metres (21.93sec) at the SAF Games in Calcutta 1987 and after winning nothing at the SAF Games in Islamabad 1989 faded away from the athletics scene.

References
sports-reference

1962 births
Olympic athletes of Pakistan
Athletes (track and field) at the 1984 Summer Olympics
Living people
Pakistani male sprinters
Asian Games competitors for Pakistan
Athletes (track and field) at the 1986 Asian Games